The following are the telephone codes in Libya.

Calling formats
To call in Libya, the following format is used:

xxx xxxx Calls within an area code

yyy xxx xxxx Calls inside Libya in city centers

+218 yyy xxx xxxx Calls to a landline from outside Libya

+218 mm xxx xxxx Calls to a mobile from outside Libya

where yyy is the area code (see below), and mm is the mobile provider code (see below).

List of area codes in Libya

References

 ITU allocations list

Libya
Telecommunications in Libya
Telephone numbers